Richie Dorman (born 14 June 1988) is a Welsh retired professional footballer, and current Technical Director for Finnish club SJK.

Early and personal life
Dorman, from Hawarden, is the brother of fellow player Andy Dorman.

Career
Dorman played for the academy of English club Blackburn Rovers, and played in the United States for the New Hampshire Phantoms in 2006. While in the United States, he also played amateur football for the Boston University Terriers. He also had two spells in his native Wales with Airbus UK. Dorman joined Finnish club Kraft on loan in April 2011. He later played for SJK. Dorman was named in the Veikkausliiga 'Team of the Month' in June 2014.

On 30 October 2018, SJK announced Dorman as their new Technical Director.

References

1988 births
Living people
Welsh footballers
Welsh expatriate footballers
Welsh expatriate sportspeople in the United States
Expatriate soccer players in the United States
Welsh expatriate sportspeople in Finland
Expatriate footballers in Finland
Blackburn Rovers F.C. players
Seacoast United Phantoms players
Airbus UK Broughton F.C. players
Närpes Kraft Fotbollsförening players
Seinäjoen Jalkapallokerho players
Cymru Premier players
Kakkonen players
Ykkönen players
Veikkausliiga players
Association football midfielders